General Sir John Finlay Willasey Wilsey  (18 February 1939 – 25 September 2019) was a British Army officer who served as Commander-in-Chief, Land Forces.

Army career
Educated at Sherborne School, John Wilsey was commissioned into the Devonshire and Dorset Regiment in 1959. He served in Northern Ireland between 1976 and 1977 where he was mentioned in despatches. In 1978 he attended the Army Staff College, Camberley. He was Commanding Officer of 1st Bn Devonshire and Dorset Regiment from 1979 to 1982. He commanded 1st Infantry Brigade from 1984 to 1986. He was Chief of Staff UK Land Forces from 1988 to 1989 and made Colonel Commandant of the Army Catering Corps in 1990. He was also given the colonelcy of the Devonshire and Dorset Regiment in 1990, holding the position until 1998.

He went on to become General Officer Commanding Northern Ireland from 1990 to 1993. It was in this capacity that he oversaw the merger between the Ulster Defence Regiment and the Royal Irish Rangers to form the Royal Irish Regiment.

He 1993 he was appointed Joint Commander of Operations in the Former Republic of Yugoslavia and relinquished his post over the Army Catering Corps in favour of the position of Colonel Commandant of the Royal Logistic Corps. In 1994 he was appointed Aide de Camp General to the Queen.

He served as the last Commander in Chief, UK Land Forces from 1993 to 1995 with the acting rank of General and then the first Commander-in-Chief, Land Command from 1995 to 1996.

He was awarded GCB in the 1996 New Year Honours.

Later career
Wilsey was the author of H. Jones VC: The Life and Death of an Unusual Hero a book about his great friend Lt Colonel 'H'. Jones who was killed in the Falklands War. He also became Chairman of Western Provident Association and Vice-Chairman of the Commonwealth War Graves Commission.

Having settled in southern Wiltshire, in July 1996 he was appointed a Deputy Lieutenant of the county.

He died on 25 September 2019 at the age of 80.

References

Further reading
Wilsey, John, H.Jones VC: The Life and Death of an Unusual Hero, Arrow Books, 2003 

 

|-

|-
 

1939 births
2019 deaths
British Army generals
Knights Grand Cross of the Order of the Bath
People educated at Sherborne School
British military personnel of The Troubles (Northern Ireland)
Devonshire and Dorset Regiment officers
Deputy Lieutenants of Wiltshire
English biographers
English male non-fiction writers
Graduates of the Staff College, Camberley